Bucculatrix andalusica is a moth species in the family Bucculatricidae. It is found in southern Spain. It was first described by G. Deschka in 1980.

The larvae feed on Artemisia vulgaris. They mine the leaves of their host plant. Possibly creating a blotch mine.

References

Natural History Museum Lepidoptera generic names catalog

Bucculatricidae
Moths described in 1980
Moths of Europe
Leaf miners